
Gmina Krzemieniewo is a rural gmina (administrative district) in Leszno County, Greater Poland Voivodeship, in west-central Poland.

Villages
Gmina Krzemieniewo contains the villages and settlements of Bielawy, Bojanice, Brylewo, Czarny Las, Drobnin, Garzyn, Górzno, Grabówiec, Granicznik, Hersztupowo, Kałowo, Karchowo, Kociugi, Krzemieniewo, Lubonia, Mały Dwór, Mierzejewo, Nadolnik, Nowy Belęcin, Oporówko, Oporowo, Pawłowice, Stary Belęcin, Wygoda and Zbytki.

Neighbouring gminas
Gmina Krzemieniewo is bordered by the gminas of Gostyń, Krzywiń, Osieczna, Poniec and Rydzyna.

References
Polish official population figures 2006

Krzemieniewo
Leszno County